Mrs Winifred Margaret Coombe Tennant (1 November 1874 – 31 August 1956) was a British suffragist, Liberal politician, philanthropist, patron of the arts and spiritualist.  She and her husband lived near Swansea in South Wales, where she became an enthusiastic proponent of Welsh cultural traditions. She was also known by the bardic name "Mam o'r Nedd".

Biography
Born Winifred Margaret Pearce-Serocold in Britain on 1 November 1874, at Rodborough Lodge, Rodborough, Gloucestershire, the only child of Royal Navy Lieutenant George Edward Pearce-Serocold (1828-1912), of a landed gentry family of Cherry Hinton, Cambridgeshire, and his second wife, Mary Clarke, daughter of Jeremiah Clarke Richardson, J.P., of Derwen Fawr, near Swansea. She was raised in France and Italy, where she was privately educated.

On 12 December 1895 she married Charles Coombe Tennant (1852–1928), who was 22 years older than she; they lived at his family's house, Cadoxton Lodge, Neath. He was son of the St Albans M.P. Charles Tennant. They had three sons, Christopher, Alexander, and Henry, and a daughter Daphne, but Christopher and Daphne died young.

Her child Henry was the result of a deliberate affair with Gerald Balfour.

Before the First World War, Mrs Coombe Tennant became a suffragist; She was a leading figure in the campaign for women's suffrage in south Wales and became president of Neath Women's Suffrage Society. In 1914 when war broke out she was appointed deputy chairman of the Women's Agricultural Committee for Glamorgan (in which capacity she served until 1918) as well as chairman of the local War Pensions Commission in 1917. She also served as director of national service for Wales. She was at pains to stress that women claimed the vote as of right and not as a reward for their war work, although she acknowledged the role the war had played in changing attitudes to women's enfranchisement. She was a leading campaigner for Lloyd George's Coalition Liberals at the general election of 1918. In 1920, she became the first woman to serve as a magistrate in Glamorgan. She was a member of the executive of the Welsh National Liberal Council and of the Committee for Self Government for Wales. In 1922 she was nominated by David Lloyd George to be a representative at the League of Nations, becoming the first British woman to do so. She was selected as the National Liberal candidate for the Forest of Dean constituency, but lost to the Labour candidate.  

As a nationalist, she was heavily involved in the Eisteddfod movement, becoming Mistress of the Robes to Gorsedd Cymru and receiving an honorary Bardic degree in 1918.

She collected works of art (including the Coombe Tennant collection of Modern French pictures); and in 1931 she became official buyer for the Glynn Vivian Art Gallery in Swansea, acquiring works by artists such as Gwen John, Kyffin Williams John Elwyn and Evan Walters. She was also a member of the Executive Committee of the Swansea Art Gallery.

Spiritualism

Under the name "Mrs Willett" she practised as a medium, her clients including Sir Oliver Lodge. She was one of the mediums involved in the cross-correspondences, in which messages from the deceased Mary Catherine Lyttleton (who died on 21 March 1875) were supposedly transmitted by automatic writing to her lover Arthur Balfour. She had a long association with the writer and spiritualist Geraldine Cummins. She died on 31 August 1956 at her home in Kensington, London. Her papers are held in the archive of the National Library of Wales After her death Cummins published the book Swan on a Black Sea, containing their correspondence, along with messages received from the alleged spirit of "Mrs Willett" describing the afterlife. However, according to the psychical researcher Eric Dingwall information published in Cummins' scripts allegedly from Willet were discovered to be erroneous.

The anthropologist and skeptic Edward Clodd wrote that the explanation for the cross-correspondences was the subconscious mind of the medium not spirits. According to Clodd many of the messages were "inconsequential rubbish". Margaret Verrall was a well-educated classicist who had studied Latin and Greek with her husband. Clodd suggested that Willet had communicated with Verrall and looked up references in classical lore.

References

Further reading
 W. Coombe Tennant, Between two worlds: the diary of Winifred Coombe Tennant 1909 – 1924 – edited by Peter Lord (2011)
 P. Lord, Winifred Coombe Tennant: A Life through Art (2008)
 Geraldine Cummins, Swan on a Black Sea (1970)

External links
Welsh Biography Online

1874 births
1956 deaths
English spiritualists
English suffragists
Liberal Party (UK) parliamentary candidates
People from Rodborough
Politicians from Swansea
Welsh politicians
Welsh spiritualists
Welsh justices of the peace